The 2017 Armed Forces Bowl was a college football bowl game played on December 23, 2017, at Amon G. Carter Stadium on the campus of Texas Christian University in Fort Worth, Texas.  The fifteenth edition of the Armed Forces Bowl featured the Army Black Knights against the San Diego State Aztecs of the Mountain West Conference.  Kickoff was scheduled for 2:30 PM CST and the game aired on ESPN.  It was one of the 2017–18 bowl games concluding the 2017 FBS football season.  Sponsored by aerospace and defense company Lockheed Martin, the game was officially known as the Lockheed Martin Armed Forces Bowl.

Teams
The game featured the Army Black Knights against the San Diego State Aztecs.

This was the third time that Army and San Diego State played each other; the Aztecs won both previous meetings, defeating the Black Knights by a score of 23–20 in West Point on September 10, 2011, and then again on September 8, 2012, this time by a score of 42–7 in San Diego.

Army Black Knights

For 2017, Army had reached a contractual agreement to play in the 2017 Armed Forces Bowl should they be bowl-eligible that season and not selected for a New Year's Six bowl game.  Immediately following their 31–28 overtime win over Temple to become bowl-eligible, the Black Knights officially accepted their invitation.

This was the Black Knights' second Armed Forces Bowl, following their victory over the SMU Mustangs in the 2010 Armed Forces Bowl by a score of 16–14.

San Diego State Aztecs

This was the Aztecs' first Armed Forces Bowl.

Game summary

Scoring Summary

Statistics

References

Armed Forces Bowl
Armed Forces Bowl
Army Black Knights football bowl games
San Diego State Aztecs football bowl games
December 2017 sports events in the United States
Armed Forces Bowl